Melville is an unincorporated community in Clatsop County, Oregon, United States, on the Lewis and Clark River. Its post office was established in February 1891, with Wilthea S. Ingalls postmaster. The post office closed in November 1922.

References

Unincorporated communities in Clatsop County, Oregon
1891 establishments in Oregon
Populated places established in 1891
Unincorporated communities in Oregon